Charles Thomas Vinci Jr. (February 28, 1933 – June 13, 2018) was an American weightlifter and Olympic champion. 
Born in Cleveland, Ohio, Vinci was the United States Senior National Champion from 1954 to 1956 and from 1958 to 1961. He received silver medals in the 1955 and 1958 world championships. He won gold medals at the 1955 and 1959 Pan American games. Just prior to weighing-in, Vinci was 1.5 pounds overweight. After an hour of running and sweating, he was still seven ounces over the limit, but a severe last-minute haircut saw him make the weight limit. He won gold again at the 1960 Summer Olympics in Rome.

During his career, Vinci set 12 world records in the bantamweight class, between 1955 and 1960. He held records in snatch, in clean and jerk and in press, as well as in total (3).

He died in Elyria, Ohio at the age of 85.

References

External links
Chuck Vinci – Hall of Fame at Weightlifting Exchange

1933 births
2018 deaths
Sportspeople from Cleveland
American male weightlifters
Weightlifters at the 1956 Summer Olympics
Weightlifters at the 1960 Summer Olympics
Olympic gold medalists for the United States in weightlifting
Olympic medalists in weightlifting
Weightlifters at the 1955 Pan American Games
Weightlifters at the 1959 Pan American Games
Pan American Games gold medalists for the United States
Medalists at the 1960 Summer Olympics
Medalists at the 1956 Summer Olympics
Pan American Games medalists in weightlifting
World Weightlifting Championships medalists
Medalists at the 1955 Pan American Games
Medalists at the 1959 Pan American Games